Pamela Nelson is an artist that works in painting, mixed media, and public art installations.

Biography
Nelson grew up in Midland, Texas, and graduated from Southern Methodist University.

Public artworks by Nelson include four Dallas Area Rapid Transit stations, a circular floor medallion at DFW Airport's Terminal D Departure Level Concourse, and Color Equations at NorthPark Center.  Nelson recently installed a painting at the Bush Presidential Center in Dallas, Texas,  titled To Everything Turn. 

Nelson has exhibited in over 100 national venues, including the Dallas Museum of Art, Austin Museum of Art, Arkansas Art Center in Little Rock, Beaumont Museum of Art, Texas, National Museum of Women in the Arts in Washington DC, and the National Arts Club in New York City.

She is represented by Craighead Green Gallery in Dallas, Texas.

References 

Year of birth missing (living people)
Living people
Southern Methodist University alumni
Mixed-media artists
American women installation artists
American installation artists
21st-century American women artists